Nelson Green Gill was a politician and educator. The Ku Klux Klan tried to murder him. He served in the Union Army during the American Civil War. He lived in Mississippi after the war and was appointed sheriff and to the board of supervisors. He also served in the state legislature and as sergeant at arms.

He served as a Freedmen's Bureau agent in Holly Springs, Mississippi after the American Civil War. A Democratic Party spokesman passed a death threat to him from the Klan. An assassination attempt against him by the Klan failed. He worked to organize African Americans in Oxford, Mississippi into a Loyal League.

Gill was critical of abuses of apprenticeship laws including the binding of a teenager to her former slaveowner instead of letting her live with her mother.

Gill was targeted for his political activities and because he fraternized with African Americans.

He served as president of the board of supervisors from 1869 to 1871.

References

19th-century American politicians
Freedmen's Bureau schoolteachers
Ku Klux Klan crimes in Mississippi
Union Army personnel